Frederick Gregory Dean (born March 30, 1955) is an American former professional football player who was an  offensive tackle and guard from 1978 to 1982 for the Washington Redskins of the National Football League (NFL).  He later played with the Tampa Bay Bandits of the United States Football League. Dean played college football at Texas Southern University.

Dean is a former member of the football coaching staff at Howard University. He also worked with Howard University's Office of Residence Life as a Community Director until his retirement after over 20 years of service.

References

1955 births
Living people
Players of American football from Gainesville, Florida
American football offensive guards
Texas Southern Tigers football players
Chicago Bears players
Washington Redskins players
Tampa Bay Bandits players